Piyush Mishra (born 4 March 1988) is an Indian politician and member of the Suheldev Bharatiya Samaj Party. He is the national spokesperson of Suheldev Bharatiya Samaj Party.

References 

1988 births
Living people
People from Lucknow
Suheldev Bhartiya Samaj Party politicians